In Search of Noah's Ark is a 1976 American documentary film based on David W. Balsiger and Charles E. Sellier Jr.'s book of the same name. Released by Sunn Classic Pictures, it explores the alleged final resting place of Noah's Ark.

Production notes
In Search of Noah's Ark was produced by Sunn Classic Pictures, a Utah-based independent film company that specialized in releasing low-budget family films and documentaries. Along with such features as Beyond and Back (1978) and In Search of Historic Jesus (1979), the film was one of a series of releases from the company that attempted to present convincing scientific evidence for Christian theology. Parts of the film were shot in Park City, Utah.

The film was based on the book by David W. Balsiger. Filmed independently and inexpensively, the documentary makes the assertion that Noah's Ark, from the biblical flood narrative, has been found on the slopes of Mount Ararat in Turkey, though physical and political difficulties prevent a more extensive study of the alleged vessel. The movie includes a re-enactment of Noah's story as one of its highlights.

Reception
In Search of Noah's Ark grossed $55.7 million at the North American box office and was the ninth highest grossing film of 1976 in the United States.

Follow-up film
On February 20, 1993, CBS aired a television special entitled The Incredible Discovery of Noah's Ark.  Produced by Sunn Classic Pictures, it was intended as an updated follow-up to In Search of Noah's Ark.  Hosted by Darren McGavin, the special features interviews with John C. Whitcomb, Philip C. Hammond, Charles Berlitz, David Coppedge, Carl Baugh and Tim LaHaye.  The special included a section devoted to the claims of George Jammal, who showed what he called "sacred wood from the ark."  Jammal's story of a dramatic mountain expedition which took the life of "his Polish friend Vladimir" was actually a deliberate hoax concocted with scholar Gerald Larue.  Jammal – who was really an actor – later revealed that his "sacred wood" was taken from railroad tracks in Long Beach, California and hardened by cooking with various sauces in an oven.

See also
 Searches for Noah's Ark
 Genesis flood narrative
 List of topics characterized as pseudoscience

References

External links
 
 “The Incredible Mysteries of Sun Pictures” on TalkOrigins
 “Sun Goes Down in Flames: The Jammal Ark Hoax” on TalkOrigins

1976 films
1976 documentary films
1976 directorial debut films
1970s English-language films
Apologetics
Films directed by James L. Conway
Films shot in Utah
Noah's Ark in film
Taft Entertainment Pictures films